The following is a partial list of people significant to the Three Kingdoms period (220–280) of Chinese history. Their romanised names start with the letter J.

J

References

 Fan, Ye. Book of the Later Han (Houhanshu).
 Chen, Shou. Records of the Three Kingdoms (Sanguozhi).
 Fang, Xuanling. Book of Jin (Jin Shu).
 Pei, Songzhi. Annotations to Records of the Three Kingdoms (Sanguozhi zhu).
 Sima, Guang. Zizhi Tongjian.

J